Riyad as-Salihin or The Meadows of the Righteous, also referred to as The Gardens of the Righteous (Arabic:  رياض الصالحين Riyāḍ aṣ-Ṣāliḥīn), is a compilation of verses from the Quran supplemented by hadith narratives written by Al-Nawawi from Damascus (1233–1277). The hadith by al-Nawawī belongs to the category of canonical Arabic collections of Islamic morals, acts of worship, and manners, which are attributed to Muhammad by Muslim scholars but not found in the Quran. The book is widely accepted to the modern Salafi scholars. Besides, Tablighi Jamaat suggests reading the book to their Arabic speaking communities instead of Fazail-e-Amal written by Zakariya Kandhlawi although it has been translated into many languages.

Description 
The Meadows of the Righteous by Al-Nawawi contains a total of 1,896 hadith divided across 344 chapters, many of which are introduced by verses of the Quran. The content of the book were studying the Hadiths in effort to translate the teaching from Quran verses into Sunnah, or practical tradition in the form of Islamic based jurisprudence and ethics. The Sunnah which covered by Nawawi includes the practice of Sahabah, which were viewed by Malik ibn Anas as "living Sunnah" who transmit the rulings directly from Muhammad.

Sections 
The book is organized into sections each representing a subject matter such as listed hereafter:

 The Book of Miscellany 
 The Book of Good Manners, 
 The Book of the Etiquette of Eating
 The Book of Dress 
 The Book of the Etiquette of Sleeping, Lying and Sitting
 The Book of Greetings
 The Book of Visiting the Sick
 The Book of Etiquette of Travelling
 The Book of Virtues
 The Book of I'tikaf
 The Book of Hajj
 The Book of Jihad
 The Book of Knowledge
 The Book of Praise and Gratitude to Allah
 The Book of Supplicating Allah to Exalt the Mention of Allah's Messenger
 The Book of the Remembrance of Allah
 The Book of Du'a (Supplications)
 The Book of the Prohibited Actions
 The Book of Miscellaneous Ahadith of Significant Values
 The Book of (Asking) Forgiveness

See also
Fazail-e-Amaal
Hadith
Kutub al-Sittah

Appendix

References

Bibliography

External links 

  Complete Riyad-us Saliheen in Arabic and English
 English Translation with short commentary
 MP3 Recording of Riyaadhus Saaliheen
 English Translation by Aisha Bewley
 Explanation of Riyadh al-Saliheen

Sunni literature
Sunni hadith collections